Mitchell John Benn (born 20 January 1970) is an English comedian, author and musician known for his comedy rock songs performed on BBC radio. He was, until 2016, a regular contributor to BBC Radio 4's satirical programme The Now Show, and has hosted other radio shows.

Benn has performed at several music festivals, and at the Edinburgh Festival Fringe. He has also released seven studio albums. His first science fiction novel, entitled Terra, was published in July 2013 by Gollancz.

Early life
Mitch Benn was born in Liverpool. He was educated at Dovedale Primary School, the then all boys voluntary aided Liverpool Blue Coat School, followed by the University of Edinburgh, where he was a prominent member of the Edinburgh University Theatre Company at the Bedlam Theatre and performed in the Improverts improvised comedy troupe. He began his comedy career in Edinburgh in 1994, moved to London in 1996 and quickly established himself as a comedy club headliner as well as a favourite on the university circuit. He has one son and daughter, Micah and Astrid (born in November 2005 and May 2008 respectively), with his former wife Clara.

Radio and television
Benn has often performed on BBC Radio 4 where he was a regular contributor to The Now Show from 1999 to 2016, and BBC Radio 2's It's Been a Bad Week (between 2000 and 2006). He is also an occasional contributor to Jammin' on BBC Radio 2. In 2004 he created his own aptly named series, Mitch Benn's Crimes Against Music on Radio 4, featuring Robin Ince and Alfie Joey; this has now run to three series. In 2005 he started a series for BBC7 called The Mitch Benn Music Show where he plays records of comic songs and invites musical comedians into the studio to perform. He took a small role as Pseudopodic Creature in the Quintessential Phase of Radio 4's The Hitchhiker's Guide to the Galaxy in 2005. Until 2014, he regularly appeared on BBC Radio 2's Steve Wright Show as the voice of "Elvis" in the "Ask Elvis" feature.

On television Mitch Benn appeared singing a song about the PlayStation 3's yellow light of death on BBC One's consumer affairs programme Watchdog.

Mitch has performed stand-up on Live at Jongleurs and The Comedy Store for the Paramount Comedy Channel, as well as two appearances with his band the Distractions (see below) for The World Stands Up (Paramount/Comedy Central). He appeared as "King Wonderful" in the CBBC comedy show Stupid! and has contributed to a couple of "talking head" nostalgia shows; X-Rated; The Videos They Tried To Ban (Channel 4) and Fifty Greatest Comedy Characters (Five). He also contributed occasional songs to Channel 4's Bremner, Bird and Fortune.

Benn regularly plays live shows at clubs and festivals in Britain, and has toured extensively overseas, including South Africa, Hong Kong and Singapore. In August 2007 he completed a successful run at the Edinburgh Fringe, performing a two-hour show, The Mitch Benn Music Club, with the Distractions. He completed a national UK tour in December 2008, the Sing Like an Angel tour, which coincided with the release of his sixth album, of the same name. Mitch Benn toured the UK again during October and November 2009 and continues to play across the country and regularly present a new one man show at the Edinburgh Fringe Festival. Together with the Distractions he runs a monthly musical comedy night at the Phoenix (Cavendish Square) on the first Tuesday of every month called The Distraction Club.

In November 2010 he released "I'm Proud of the BBC", a song listing many of the corporation's achievements. The track was available for download only and made it to 11th in the Independent Singles Chart.

In September 2013 he took over the role of Zaphod Beeblebrox in the touring production of "The Hitchhiker's Guide to the Galaxy Live Radio Show".

In Autumn 2020 Mitch was a member of the Walruses in Series 16 of the BBC Two quiz show Only Connect alongside musical satirist Emma Kennedy and Mastermind finalist Dan Adler. His team reached the quarter-final round but were eliminated in the 17th episode of the series broadcast on January 11, 2021.

Twitter
During the 26th series of The Now Show broadcast between March and April 2009 Benn launched an attempt to increase his follows. Annoyed at the fact that only a few people followed him on Twitter, Benn planned to make himself the "King of Twitter" by getting the show's 1.5 million listeners to follow his account and therefore have more followers than Stephen Fry, who he claimed was the current king. Within a week of his announcement, the number of people following Benn more than tripled, from about 1,200 followers to just under 4,000. Later in the same series, Benn performed a song expressing his anger that Coldplay beat him into having more followers than Fry first, making remarks that it was not the band themselves posting messages and that as the band has four members, the number of followers should have been divided by four. Benn also mentioned that some of his followers were worried that he was becoming too obsessed with Twitter. In the last episode of the series, Benn wrote what he claimed was his final Twitter song, which specially featured Fry telling Benn that if he renounced his claim as King of Twitter, Fry would make him "Viceroy of Facebook", which Benn did. Benn also referenced the passing of the one million mark on the site.

In October 2009, "The History of the World Through Twitter", co-written by Benn and his fellow Now Show presenter Jon Holmes, was published by Prion Books.

Together with his wife, Benn runs a Twitter feed for their daughter, Astrid (who was four years old at the time it was created), "Stuff Astrid Says". They have so far declined to create a Twitter feed for the family dog "Rowlf", despite requests.

Albums
Mitch has released eight CDs to date: The Unnecessary Mitch Benn (1998), a collection of favourite live songs, recorded on a Walkman carried in his pocket at various gigs that year; Radio Face (2002), including material previously heard on Radio 2 and Radio 4; and, with the Distractions, Too Late To Cancel (2004), and Crimes Against Music (2005). The single "Everything Sounds Like Coldplay Now" was released in September 2005 as a taster for the album, hitting the lower regions of the UK chart, and, the video (see external link) is still receiving heavy rotation on the Paramount Comedy Channel. The Distractions are Kirsty Newton of the band Siskin (vocals, bass and keyboard) and Ivan Sheppard (drums), who replaced Tash Baylis (also of Weapons) in 2006. Mitch provides most of the vocals and plays the guitar. As well as touring and releasing material, the band support Mitch Benn for some of his comedy programmes, such as the Mitch Benn's Crimes Against Music.

In October 2007, a fifth album, The Official Edinburgh Bootleg 2007 (swiftly dubbed "The Brown Album" because of its mock brown paper cover art), recorded on the final night of his show at the Edinburgh Fringe, was made available exclusively to those who attended his autumn 2007 tour.

In March 2008, Benn released the single "Happy Birthday War", to commemorate the fifth anniversary of the Iraq War, with an accompanying video.

The release of his sixth album, Sing Like an Angel, coincided with his autumn 2008 tour of the same name. The title track, featuring Rick Wakeman on piano, was released as a single on iTunes on 1 September 2008. A video was produced to accompany the single.

In October 2009, Benn released his seventh album, Where Next?. His seventh studio album, Breaking Strings, was released in March 2012. It features "I'm Proud of the BBC", "I Love My Phone", "The Library" and "Song for Europe".

Mitch Benn uses and endorses Line 6 guitars and amplification. His current on-stage rig consists of a Variax 700 (replacing the Variax 500 as seen on the cover of Crimes Against Music) played through a PodxtLive.

Awards
In 1995 Mitch Benn won the Best New Comedian competition at the Glastonbury Festival, and has played there every year since.

In May 2007 he won BBC Radio Merseyside's "Scouseology" award for his work on radio.

In October 2007 he was awarded "Personality of the Year" at the final Cult TV convention

In January 2008, Benn was listed among the "Scouserati", a list of 365 culturally significant Liverpudlians published by the Liverpool Echo to commemorate the beginning of Liverpool's tenure as the European Capital of Culture.

Weight loss
Having always struggled with obesity (a previous slimming attempt in 2008 having been covered in his blog), Benn began the Lighter Life very low calorie diet programme in January 2011; according to his Twitter account, by the end of June 2011 he had lost over 10 stone (140 lb/64 kg).

Discography

Albums
 The Unnecessary Mitch Benn (1998)
 Radio Face (2002)
 Too Late To Cancel (2004)
 Crimes Against Music (2005)
 The Official Edinburgh Bootleg 2007 (2007)
 Sing Like An Angel (2008)
 Where Next? (2009)
 Breaking Strings (2012)

Singles
 "Everything Sounds Like Coldplay Now" (2005) (#250 UK Singles Chart)
 "Happy Birthday War" (2008)
 "I'm Proud of the BBC" (2010)

References

External links 

 
 
 
 The video for the single "Everything Sounds Like Coldplay Now"
 
 REVIEW : Terra's World by Mitch Benn on Upcoming4.me

1970 births
Living people
Alumni of the University of Edinburgh
Anglo-Scots
English male comedians
English comedy musicians
English people of Scottish descent
Musicians from Liverpool
Comedians from Liverpool
People educated at Liverpool Blue Coat School
20th-century English comedians
21st-century English comedians
British parodists
Parody musicians
British novelty song performers
BBC Radio 4